Gustav Diessl (30 December 1899 – 20 March 1948) was an Austrian artist, and film and stage actor.

Biography
Diessl was born Gustav Karl Balthasar Diessl in Vienna. In 1916, he was an extra on different stages in Vienna but was soon recruited into the army for World War I. During his military service, he was held prisoner for a year.

After the war, Diessl started training as a stage designer but left to pursue a professional career in acting. Meanwhile, he played for a touring company and in 1921 had his first fixed engagement at the Neue Wiener Bühne. That same year he made his film debut, appearing in Im Banne der Kralle, which was produced in Austria and directed by Carl Froelich (G. W. Pabst, who would later direct Diessl in Vastfronten 1918, made his only appearance as a screen actor in this film). Over the years, Diessl compiled an extensive filmography, including many romantic comedies, several of which were filmed in war-time Italy. One of his more notable roles is in the German 1945 propaganda epic  Kolberg, which Nazi officials designed to bolster the peoples' morale at a time when a German victory in World War II seemed increasingly hopeless.

After his first marriage ended, Diessl lived with actress Camilla Horn for several years. After this, he married a second time in 1938 to soprano Maria Cebotari. Diessl died in 1948 following two strokes.

Selected filmography

 In Thrall to the Claw (1921) - Ingenieur
 Vineta, the Sunken City (1923)
 Ssanin (1924)
 The Revenge of the Pharaohs (1925) - Hussein - Kemal
 Sensations-Prozess (1928) - Dr. Spindler
 Abgründe (1928) - Thomas Beck, Lawyer
 The Devious Path (1928)
 Pandora's Box (1929) - Jack the Ripper
 The Living Corpse (1929) - Viktor Mikhajlovich Karenin
 That Murder in Berlin (1929)
 Marriage (1929)
 The Man Without Love (1929) - Mérone - ein Schauspieler
 A Mother's Love (1929) - Hans Immermann
 The White Hell of Pitz Palu (1929) - Dr. Johannes Krafft
 Women on the Edge (1929) - Robert Stevens
 Three Around Edith (1929) - Roger Brown
 Westfront 1918 (1930) - Karl
 Morals at Midnight (1930) - Brat, ein Gefangener
 Lieutenant, Were You Once a Hussar? (1930) - Fedor Karew
 Hans in Every Street (1930) - Soranzo
 The Great Longing (1930) - Himself
 Das gelbe Haus des King-Fu (1931) - King-Fu / Scalpa
 Men Behind Bars (1931) - Morris
 Nights in Port Said (1932) - Seaman Hans
 Die Herrin von Atlantis (1932) - Morhange
 Teilnehmer antwortet nicht (1932) - Konrad Quandt
  (1932) - Martin
 Die Herrgottsgrenadiere (1932) - Faletti
 The Testament of Dr. Mabuse (1933) - Thomas Kent
 Roman einer Nacht (1933) - Der Fremde
 S.O.S. Eisberg (1933) - Professor Dr. Karl Lorenz
 Weiße Majestät (1934) - Jakob Burghardt, Bergführer
 Un de la montagne (1934) - Jacques Burgard
 Everything for a Woman (1935) - Frederic Keyne, Flugzeuginsustrieller
 Demon of the Himalayas (1935) - Dr. Norman - Ethnologe
 The Love of the Maharaja (1936) - Maharadscha
 A Woman Between Two Worlds (1936) - Dr. Hellwig
 Moscow-Shanghai (1936) - Serge Smrirnow
 Shadows of the Past (1936)
 Starke Herzen (1937) - Rittmeister Alexander von Harbin
 The Tiger of Eschnapur (1938) - Sascha Demidoff, Abenteurer
 The Indian Tomb (1938) - Sascha Demidoff, Ingenieur
 Fortsetzung folgt (1938) - Fred, sein Freund
 Kautschuk (1938) - Don Alonzo de Ribeira
 The Green Emperor (1939) - Henry Miller / Hendrik Mylius
 Ich verweigere die Aussage (1939) - Robert Lenart
 I Am Sebastian Ott (1939) - Strobl
 The Star of Rio (1940) - Don Felipe Escobar
 Herz ohne Heimat (1940) - Alexander Diersberg, sein Stiefbruder
 Senza cielo (1940) - Dr. Martin
 The Comedians (1941) - Ernst Biron, Count of Kurland
 Clarissa (1941) - Bankdirektor Feerenbach
 The Hero of Venice (1941) - Marco Fuser
 Menschen im Sturm (1941) - Alexander Oswatic
 The Woman of Sin (1942)
 Maria Malibran (1943)
 Calafuria (1943) - Tommaso Bardelli
 La danza del fuoco (1943) - Giulio Boldrini
 Nora (1944) - Dr. Rank
 Mist on the Sea (1944) - Pietro Rosati
 Ein Blick zurück (1944) - Erwin Corbach
  Kolberg (1944) - Lt. Schill
 The Trial (1948) - Prosecutor Both
 The Appeal to Conscience (1949) - Dr. Gregor Karpinski (final film role)

External links
 
 Short Illustrated Biography
 Gustav Diessl's Biography(in German)
 Photographs and literature

1899 births
1948 deaths
Austrian male film actors
Austrian male silent film actors
Male actors from Vienna
20th-century Austrian male actors
Burials at Döbling Cemetery